Forests of Witchery is the debut album by symphonic black metal band Thy Serpent. This was the band's first collaborative work; the previously released demos were created solely by Sami Tenetz, who currently is rhythm guitarist of the band. It has a more doom/gothic feel than later albums.

Track listing
 Flowers of Witchery Abloom
 Of Darkness and Light
 A Traveller of Unknown Plains
 Only Dust Moves...
 Like a Funeral Veil of Melancholy
 Wine from Tears

Credits
All music by Thy Serpent.
All lyrics by Antti Litmanen except A Traveller of Unknown Plains by Myst
Engineered by Ahti Kortelainen
Sami - guitars
Luopio - bass, backing vocals
Azhemin - synth, vocals
Agathon - drums

1996 albums
Thy Serpent albums